Mal Pearson is a former American football coach.  He served as the head football coach at Wheaton College in Wheaton, Illinois for two seasons, from 1969 to 1970, compiling a record of 4–13–1.

References

Year of birth missing (living people)
Living people
Wheaton Thunder football coaches